hellbanianz is an Albanian organised street gang based in the barking london  

HB is a street gang that has been active since 1999  

prison, 

they constantly post their criminal lives on social media .

History

References 

Albanian Mafia
Organised crime gangs of London
London street gangs
English people of Albanian descent